Barbara Joan Kuriger (born 1961) is a New Zealand politician who was elected to the New Zealand parliament at the 2014 general election as a representative of the New Zealand National Party.

Farming career
Kuriger is a farmer, shareholder and director of three family-owned farming businesses. She has also served on the boards of several companies and institutions including DairyNZ, Dairy Training Limited, Primary ITO, New Zealand Young Farmers, Taratahi Agricultural Training Centre, Te Kauta, Venture Taranaki Trust, and the Dairy Women's Network. In 2012, she won the title of Dairy Woman of the Year.

Kuriger is a former director of Oxbow Dairies Ltd which was charged with multiple counts of animal cruelty and neglect. Kuriger ceased being a director in 2014, while her husband Louis was still a director until late 2018 during which period the bulk of the charges were laid and offences committed, her son, Tony, pleaded guilty in January 2020 for causing "prolonged and severe pain" to the animals in his care.

Political career

Fifth National Government, 2014–2017
In April 2014, Kuriger was selected as National's representative in Taranaki-King Country to replace incumbent Member of Parliament Shane Ardern. During the 2014 New Zealand general election, she won Taranaki-King Country for National by a margin of 16,773 votes.

During the Fifth National Government, Kuriger served as Deputy Chairperson of the Health Committee and as a member of the Primary Production Committee. In Opposition, she served as the National Party's Senior Whip from 2018 to 2020.

In 2015, David Cunliffe called out Kuriger for "ignorance" over the funding rorts at Taratahi Agricultural Training Centre while she was on its board.

Sixth Labour Government, 2017–present
During the 2017 New Zealand general election, Kuriger retained Taranaki-King Country for National by a margin of 15,259 votes.

During the 2020 New Zealand general election, Kuriger retained Taranaki-King Country for National by a final margin of 3,134 votes.

In October 2022 Kuriger resigned from her agriculture, biosecurity, and food safety portfolios due to mismanaging conflicts of interest with the Ministry for Primary Industries (MPI) over the prosecution of her husband and son.

In December 2022, hundreds of pages of emails between Kuriger and MPI, obtained by Newsroom under the Official Information Act, revealed a pattern of personal attacks on MPI officials in relation to animal mistreatment charges filed against her son Tony. MPI commissioned Mike Heron KC to review its conduct in the case. That review cleared the ministry of any wrongdoing and found the investigation into Tony Kuriger was not motivated by political purposes, despite the Kurigers' repeated private and public claims to the contrary. 

Following a reshuffle in National Party leader Christopher Luxon's shadow cabinet that occurred on 19 January 2023, Kuriger was allocated the conservation spokesperson portfolio but was moved outside of the shadow cabinet with no ranking.

Other activities
Kuriger currently sits on the board of the New Zealand Rural Games Trust.

References

External links 
National Party page for Taranaki-King Country 
Barbara Kuriger's website 
Parliament website page for Barbara Kruiger

Living people
New Zealand National Party MPs
Members of the New Zealand House of Representatives
Women members of the New Zealand House of Representatives
New Zealand MPs for North Island electorates
21st-century New Zealand politicians
21st-century New Zealand women politicians
Candidates in the 2017 New Zealand general election
1961 births